Sisay, also Sissay, is a male given name of Ethiopian origin. Notable people with the name include:

Sisay Bancha (born 1989), Ethiopian international footballer
Lemn Sissay (born 1967), British-Ethiopian writer

Ethiopian given names
Masculine given names
Amharic-language names

SISAY en Quechua o Kichwa (Ecuador) significa “Florecer”.

SISAY es un grupo de música tradicional andina de origen Ecuatoriano y radicado en Japón.